Mohamed Sedky Mahmoud (December 12, 1914 – 1984) was an Egyptian military leader. He served as Air Force Chief of Staff from June 23, 1953 to September 19, 1959, and Air Force and Defense Commander from September 20, 1959 to June 11, 1967.

Sedky Mahmoud was born in Sendalia village, Daqahliah. He graduated from the Egyptian Military Academy in 1936, and studied at the Abu Swair Aviation School No. 4. He became the first Egyptian instructor in 1936, later became the lead aviation instructor and headed the High Aviation School in 1944.

Sedky Mahmoud achieved the rank of Wing Commander and became head of the Dekhila Air Base in August 1949, and then Almaza Air Base in August 1951. He was promoted as the 1st Lt. Gen. in 1952.

Air Marshal M Sedky Mahmoud was involved in the development of the Helwan HA-300.

During his tenure, he carried out official visits to the United States, India, Algeria, Iraq, Yemen, and Saudi Arabia. He took part in World War II, the 1948 Arab–Israeli War, the Tripartite Aggression, operations in Yemen in 1967 and the Six-Day War. During the Six-Day War, in 1967, he and the other senior Egyptian commanders, including Field Marshal Amer and General Anwar al-Qadi were in a plane en route to Bir al-Thamada to inspect the troops stationed in the Sinai when the Israeli offensive Operation Focus began on the morning of 5 June. The bulk of Egypt's combat aircraft were destroyed in the attack.

References

External links
 Biography at the Egyptian Armed Forces website

Egyptian Air Force air marshals
1914 births
1984 deaths